Clifton Down is one of the thirty-four council wards in the city of Bristol in the Southwest of England, United Kingdom.

Clifton Down

The ward covers the area between the Downs, Pembroke Road, Hampton Road and Queens Road, with Whiteladies Road running down the middle. Parts of the ward are sometimes locally known as Clifton, Redland, or Cotham, although these are in fact neighbouring council wards.

Clifton Down has a large number of students living in the area. Over 30% of the population is aged 20–24, significantly higher than the national average.

Notable places in the Clifton Down ward include Clifton Down railway station, Clifton Down Shopping Centre, Whiteladies Picture House, The Bristol Improv Theatre and Bristol Lido.

Politics

Clifton Down ward was created in May 2016 following a boundary review. It incorporates areas that were previously part of Clifton East and Cotham wards. It is represented by two councillors on Bristol City Council. Currently, these are Carla Denyer and Clive Stevens, both Green Party members.

Clifton Down is part of the parliamentary constituency of Bristol West. Since 2015 the Member of Parliament is Thangam Debbonaire, a Labour party member.

See also
Clifton Down public open space
Clifton Down railway station

References

External links
Map of Clifton Down ward.
Find your councillor page on Bristol City Council website

Wards of Bristol
Clifton, Bristol